Rudy & Blitz (also spelled Rudy + Blitz) was a rock band formed by American musicians Chad Ginsburg, Dante Cimino and Dave Kloos in the early 1990s near Philadelphia.

Rudy & Blitz were signed to Ruffhouse/Columbia. Later, they were dropped due to conflicts between the band and the record label. Ginsburg eventually regained ownership of the bands master recordings, which he intended on shopping around to other labels, but the group disbanded before this came to fruition. Ginsburg went on to join CKY.

Members 
Chad Ginsburg – guitars, vocals
Dave Kloos – lead vocals, bass
Dante Cimino – drums, vocals

Discography 
1995: Thanks Anyway (7" vinyl)
1997: Reverb on the Click (re-released 2003)
2009: Distant Recordings: 15 Years (re-release of Reverb on the Click, with Foreign Objects and CKY: Disengage the Simulator EP)
 2011: Philmont Ave. Demo Collection 1993–1995 (30-track collection consisting of demos along with recorded tracks not included with Reverb on the Click)

External links 
Rudy + Blitz fan website (archived)
Rudy + Blitz picture gallery

CKY
Rock music groups from Pennsylvania
Musical groups from Philadelphia